is a district located in Tokushima Prefecture, Japan.

As of June 1, 2019, the district has an estimated population of 14,025 and a density of 115 persons per km2. The total area is 122.48 km2.

Towns and villages 
Higashimiyoshi

Mergers 
On March 1, 2006 the towns of Ikawa, Ikeda, Mino and Yamashiro, and the villages of Higashiiyayama and Nishiiyayama merged to form the new city of Miyoshi. (Merger Information Page)
On March 1, 2006 the towns of Mikamo and Miyoshi merged to form the new town of Higashimiyoshi. (Merger Information Page)

Districts in Tokushima Prefecture